In enzymology, a N-acetylglucosamine kinase is an enzyme that catalyzes the chemical reaction

ATP + N-acetyl-D-glucosamine  ADP + N-acetyl-D-glucosamine 6-phosphate

Thus, the two substrates of this enzyme are ATP and N-acetyl-D-glucosamine, whereas its two products are ADP and N-acetyl-D-glucosamine 6-phosphate.

This enzyme belongs to the family of transferases, specifically those transferring phosphorus-containing groups (phosphotransferases) with an alcohol group as acceptor.  The systematic name of this enzyme class is ATP:N-acetyl-D-glucosamine 6-phosphotransferase. Other names in common use include acetylglucosamine kinase (phosphorylating), ATP:2-acetylamino-2-deoxy-D-glucose 6-phosphotransferase, 2-acetylamino-2-deoxy-D-glucose kinase, and acetylaminodeoxyglucokinase.  This enzyme participates in glutamate metabolism and aminosugars metabolism.

References 

 
 
 

EC 2.7.1
Enzymes of known structure